The 1969 NCAA College Division baseball tournament decided the champion of baseball at the NCAA College Division level for the 1969 season. This was the second such tournament for the College Division, having separated from the University Division in 1957.

Format
Seventeen teams were selected to participate, divided into four regions.  Three regions consisted of four teams, while the West Region had five.  Each region completed a double-elimination round, with the winners advancing to the finals.  The finals, made up of the four regional champions, also competed in a double-elimination format.

Regionals

East Regional

Mideast Regional

Midwest Regional

West Regional

Finals

Participants

Results

Bracket

Game results

See also
 1969 NCAA University Division baseball tournament
 1969 NAIA World Series

References

 
NCAA Division II Baseball Tournament
NCAA College Division baseball tournament